Rory Currie (born 20 February 1998) is a Scottish footballer who plays for Lowland Football League club Tranent Juniors as a striker. He has previously played for Heart of Midlothian, East Fife, Forfar Athletic, Linfield and Brechin City.

Career
Currie began his football career with Celtic's youth teams before leaving to join the Rangers Academy in January 2016 on a contract until the end of the 2015–16 season.

Currie was released by Rangers in May 2016 but joined Heart of Midlothian. He made his professional debut for Heart of Midlothian as a 75th-minute substitute during a 3–0 home win against Motherwell on 28 November 2016. He followed this a month later with his second league appearance against Aberdeen on 30 December.

In January 2017, he was named as one of the Daily Records Scottish footballing prospects for 2017 alongside Tony Gallagher, Matthew Knox, Ronan Hughes,  Liam Burt and Jack Aitchison. Currie suffered a serious knee ligament injury in November 2017. He was subsequently loaned to East Fife, Forfar Athletic and Linfield.

Currie was released by Hearts after the 2019/20 season and was signed by Brechin City in August 2020.

Career statistics

References

External links

1998 births
Living people
Sportspeople from Lanark
Scottish footballers
Association football forwards
Rangers F.C. players
Heart of Midlothian F.C. players
Celtic F.C. players
Scottish Professional Football League players
East Fife F.C. players
Forfar Athletic F.C. players
Linfield F.C. players
Brechin City F.C. players
Footballers from South Lanarkshire